Sydenham may refer to:

Places

Australia
 Sydenham, New South Wales, a suburb of Sydney
 Sydenham railway station, Sydney
 Sydenham, Victoria, a suburb of Melbourne
 Sydenham railway line, the name of the Sunbury railway line, Melbourne until 2012
 Watergardens railway station, formerly called Sydenham

Canada
 Sydenham, Frontenac County, Ontario
 Sydenham Ward, a district within the city of Kingston, Ontario
 Sydenham, Grey County, Ontario, a former township within Meaford
 Owen Sound, Ontario, formerly called Sydenham
 Sydenham River (Lake Huron), which empties into Georgian Bay on Lake Huron, Ontario
 Sydenham River (Lake Saint Clair), which empties into Lake Saint Clair, Ontario

India 
 Sydenham College, Mumbai

New Zealand
 Sydenham, New Zealand, a suburb of Christchurch
 Sydenham (New Zealand electorate), a former Christchurch electorate

South Africa
 Sydenham, Durban, an inner city suburb of Durban, South Africa
 Sydenham, Gauteng, a suburb of Johannesburg, South Africa
 Sydenham, Port Elizabeth, South Africa, on route R75

United Kingdom

London
 Sydenham, London
 Sydenham railway station (London)
 Sydenham Hill
 Sydenham Hill railway station
 Lower Sydenham railway station
 Sydenham High School, a private school for girls
 Sydenham School, a state school for girls

Belfast
 Sydenham, Belfast, a suburb and electoral ward of East Belfast
 Sydenham railway station (Belfast)

Other places in UK
 Sydenham, Oxfordshire, near Thame
 Sydenham, Somerset, an area of Bridgwater, Somerset
 Sydenham, Leamington Spa, a suburb of Royal Leamington Spa, Warwickshire
 Sydenham Damerel, Devon
 Sydenham House, Devon, the seat built by Sir Thomas Wise in Marystow parish, Devon

United States
 Sydenham Hospital for Communicable Diseases, Baltimore
 The former Sydenham Hospital, Harlem, New York City

People
 Charles Poulett Thomson, 1st Baron Sydenham
 John Sydenham (disambiguation)
 Thomas Sydenham, English physician
 Colonel William Sydenham, Cromwellian soldier and brother of Thomas
 Sydenham Elnathan Ancona (1824–1913), Democratic member of the U.S. House of Representatives from

Medicine
 Sydenham's chorea, an infectious disease involving the central nervous system

See also
 Sydenham House (disambiguation)
 Sydenham railway station (disambiguation)